"Dile Al Amor" is Aventura's fourth single from their fifth and final studio album The Last (2009). This was the second song from Aventura to reach number-one on Hot Latin Tracks.

Music video
"Dile Al Amor" music video is Romeo having bad luck with love in his life, because of Cupid missing every arrow she throws.

Charts

Weekly charts

Year-end charts

Decade-end charts

References

Category:Billboard Latin Rhythm Airplay number-one singles

2009 singles
Aventura (band) songs
Songs written by Romeo Santos
Monitor Latino Top General number-one singles
2009 songs